Power is an American men's 3-on-3 basketball team that plays in the BIG3 league. 

They are the 2018 BIG3 season champions.

History

2017

Draft

Season Performance
Power were one of the teams who made the playoffs at the end of the BIG3 inaugural season of 2017. 

Their run quickly ended with a semifinal loss to the 3 Headed Monsters. They lost a consolation game the next week, and finished 4th overall.

2018

Draft

Season Performance
Power went on to win the BIG3 championship in 2018. It was their first championship.

2019

Draft
As the reigning champs, Power did not have the opportunity to make a draft selection but they kept all six players from last year's squad.

Season Performance 
Power made the playoffs for the third consecutive year in 2019. They were unable to repeat their 2018 championship run, losing in the semifinals.

2021

Draft

Season Performance
TBD

2022

Draft

Season Performance
TBD

Current roster

Alumni
 Chris Andersen
 Corey Maggette
 Deshawn Stevenson
 Dušan Bulut (2021)
 Glen Davis
 Jerome Williams
 Joe Alexander (2021)
 Moochie Norris
 Ryan Gomes
 Quentin Richardson
 Xavier Silas

References

Big3 teams
Basketball teams established in 2017
2017 establishments in the United States